The men's 400 metres hurdles was the longer of the men's hurdle races in the Athletics at the 1964 Summer Olympics program in Tokyo. It was held on 14 October, 15 October, and 16 October 1964. 39 athletes from 26 nations competed, with 1 more not starting in the first round. The maximum number of athletes per nation had been set at 3 since the 1930 Olympic Congress. The first round was held on 14 October, with the semifinals on 15 October and the final on 16 October. The event was won by Rex Cawley of the United States, the nation's sixth consecutive and 11th overall victory in the men's 400 metres hurdles. For the first time since 1952, the Americans did not sweep the event. John Cooper earned Great Britain's first medal in the event since 1928 with his silver; Salvatore Morale took Italy's first-ever medal in the 400 metres hurdles with his bronze.

Background

This was the 13th time the event was held. It had been introduced along with the men's 200 metres hurdles in 1900, with the 200 being dropped after 1904 and the 400 being held through 1908 before being left off the 1912 programme. However, when the Olympics returned in 1920 after World War I, the men's 400 metres hurdles was back and would continue to be contested at every Games thereafter.

None of the six finalists from the 1960 Games returned. American Rex Cawley was the favorite after setting a world record at the U.S. trials; he was also the 1963 AAU champion.

Malaysia, Peru, Senegal, and Uganda each made their debut in the event. The United States made its 13th appearance, the only nation to have competed at every edition of the event to that point.

Competition format

The competition used the three-round format used every Games since 1908 (except the four-round competition in 1952): quarterfinals, semifinals, and a final. Ten sets of hurdles were set on the course. The hurdles were 3 feet (91.5 centimetres) tall and were placed 35 metres apart beginning 45 metres from the starting line, resulting in a 40 metres home stretch after the last hurdle. The 400 metres track was standard.

The format also continued to use the "fastest loser" system introduced in 1960. The 1964 event standardized later-round heat sizes at 8 rather than 6.

There were 5 quarterfinal heats with 8 athletes each (before one withdrawal). The top 3 men in each quarterfinal advanced to the semifinals, along with the next fastest hurdler overall. The 16 semifinalists were divided into 2 semifinals of 8 athletes each, with the top 4 in each semifinal advancing to the 8-man final.

Records

Prior to the competition, the existing world and Olympic records were as follows.

No new world or Olympic records were set during the competition.

Schedule

All times are Japan Standard Time (UTC+9)

Results

Quarterfinals

The top three runners in each of the 5 heats as well as the fastest remaining runner advanced.

Quarterfinal 1

Quarterfinal 2

Quarterfinal 3

Quarterfinal 4

Anisimov is listed in the Official Report results for heat 4 as being a competitor for the United States; however, the Official Report lists his nationality as Soviet in all other instances in the report.

Quarterfinal 5

Semifinals

The fastest four runners of each of the two semifinals advanced to the final.

Semifinal 1

Semifinal 2

Final

Results summary

References

Athletics at the 1964 Summer Olympics
400 metres hurdles at the Olympics
Men's events at the 1964 Summer Olympics